Full View is an album by jazz pianist Wynton Kelly, recorded in 1966 and released on the Milestone label, featuring performances by Kelly with Ron McClure and Jimmy Cobb.

Reception
The AllMusic review by Scott Yanow awarded the album 3 stars, stating "Pianist Wynton Kelly's next-to-last set as a leader featured him at a time when his influence was waning and he was overshadowed by more advanced players. However, Kelly's impact would begin to grow again after his death, when the Young Lions movement began in the early '80s".

Track listing
 "I Want a Little Girl" (Murray Mencher, Billy Moll) – 4:42
 "I Thought" (Rudy Stevenson) – 4:51
 "What a Diff'rence a Day Made" (Stanley Adams, María Grever) – 4:47
 "Autumn Leaves" (Joseph Kosma, Johnny Mercer, Jacques Prévert) – 3:51
 "Don't Cha Hear Me Callin' to Ya" (Stevenson) – 4:27
 "On a Clear Day (You Can See Forever)" (Burton Lane, Alan Jay Lerner) – 3:14
 "Scufflin'" (Wynton Kelly) – 3:02
 "Born to Be Blue" (Mel Tormé, Robert Wells) – 4:07
 "Walk On By" (Burt Bacharach, Hal David) – 3:15
Recorded in New York City in September 1966

Personnel
Wynton Kelly – piano
Ron McClure – bass
Jimmy Cobb – drums

References

Further reading
Mueller, Michael (September 2013) "Keyboard School: Woodshed: Solo". Down Beat. pp. 80–81. A transcription and analysis of Kelly's solo on "Scufflin'".

1967 albums
Milestone Records albums
Wynton Kelly albums
albums produced by Orrin Keepnews